The End of the Trail is a sculpture by James Earle Fraser located in Waupun, Wisconsin, United States. It depicts a weary Native American man hanging limp as his weary horse comes to the edge of the Pacific Ocean. The statue is a commentary on the damage Euro-American settlement inflicted upon Native Americans. The main figure embodies the suffering and exhaustion of people driven from their native lands.

History

Fraser first modeled the subject in 1894. He based it on his experience as a boy in the Dakota Territory. His memoirs state, "as a boy, I remembered an old Dakota trapper saying, 'The Indians will someday be pushed into the Pacific Ocean.'" Later he stated "the idea occurred to me of making an Indian which represented his race reaching the end of the trail, at the edge of the Pacific."

A large plaster version of the work was displayed at the 1915 Panama–Pacific International Exposition in San Francisco and was awarded a gold medal. Soon prints and photographs of the statue became popular. When the Exposition closed, bronze was not available for casting statues because of World War I and the plaster sculpture was thrown into a mud pit in Marina Park near the site of the Exhibition. Fraser sold two sizes of bronze copies starting in 1918. The plaster version was rescued in 1919 and moved to Mooney Grove Park, in Visalia, California.

The Waupun statue is a copy of the plaster statue cast in bronze. The bronze version was commissioned by Clarence Shaler in 1926, and was dedicated on June 23, 1929, as a tribute to the Native Americans.

The original was moved from Visalia to Oklahoma City, Oklahoma in 1968, where it was restored and is now on display at the National Cowboy & Western Heritage Museum.  The City of Visalia received a bronze replica as a replacement.

The Waupun statue was added to the National Register of Historic Places in 1980.

Today
Many copies of the 1915 statue are on display, including one at the Metropolitan Museum of Art in New York City, another in the library at Winona State University in Fraser's hometown of Winona, Minnesota, and a 1929 monument at the Riverside Cemetery in Oshkosh, Wisconsin. A painting of the statue's image appeared on the original cover of the 1971 album Surf's Up by the Beach Boys.

References

External links
 

1894 sculptures
Bronze sculptures in Wisconsin
Equestrian statues in Wisconsin
Monuments and memorials on the National Register of Historic Places in Wisconsin
National Register of Historic Places in Fond du Lac County, Wisconsin
Native American history of Wisconsin
Outdoor sculptures in Wisconsin
Sculptures of men in Wisconsin
Sculptures of Native Americans
Works by James Earle Fraser (sculptor)